Tetrameranthus globuliferus is a species of plant in the Annonaceae family. It is endemic to Ecuador.  Its natural habitat is subtropical or tropical moist lowland forests.

References

Annonaceae
Endemic flora of Ecuador
Near threatened plants
Near threatened biota of South America
Taxonomy articles created by Polbot